A Bobby Vee discography

Chart singles

Albums

Note: Cashbox featured separate charts for stereo and mono albums until 1965 when both charts were merged into one

Compilations

The Very Best of Bobby Vee (May 12, 2008) was certified silver in the UK.
The Bobby Vee Singles Album reached number 5 in the UK in April 1980 and was certified gold in the UK.

https://web.archive.org/web/20161030205327/http://www.bobbyvee.net/bobby.html

References

External links

Rock music discographies
Discographies of American artists